James J. Kissane, Jr. (born August 17, 1946) is an American former professional basketball player. He played in the American Basketball Association for the Minnesota Pipers in just two games during the 1968–69 season. He scored six points and grabbed three rebounds total.

As a player at Boston College, Kissane's squads made the National Invitation Tournament once and NCAA Tournament twice in the three varsity seasons in which he was eligible to play.

References

1946 births
Living people
American men's basketball players
Basketball players from New York (state)
Boston College Eagles men's basketball players
Cincinnati Royals draft picks
Forwards (basketball)
Minnesota Pipers players
People from New Hyde Park, New York